Mario Ravagnan (18 December 1930 – 13 December 2006) was an Italian fencer. He won a bronze medal in the team sabre event at the 1960 Summer Olympics and a silver in the same event at the 1964 Summer Olympics.

References

1930 births
2006 deaths
Italian male fencers
Olympic fencers of Italy
Fencers at the 1956 Summer Olympics
Fencers at the 1960 Summer Olympics
Fencers at the 1964 Summer Olympics
Olympic silver medalists for Italy
Olympic bronze medalists for Italy
Olympic medalists in fencing
Medalists at the 1960 Summer Olympics
Medalists at the 1964 Summer Olympics